Grand Stade de Casablanca is a proposed title of the planned football stadium (soccer stadium) to be built in Casablanca, Morocco. Once completed in 2025, it will be used mostly for football matches and will serve as the home of the Morocco national football team. The stadium is planned with a capacity of 93,000 spectators, making it the third-highest capacity football (soccer) stadium in Africa. If completed, it will replace Stade Mohamed V.

Overview
The initial idea of the stadium was for the World Cup in 2010, for which Morocco lost their bid to South Africa.  This included five major stadiums across the country, including Ibn Batouta Stadium, Stade de Marrakech and two more in the major cities of Agadir and Fes. It was one of the 14 host venues for Morocco's bid to host the World Cup in 2026. It would've staged the Opening and Final matches if Morocco was awarded for the World Cup but lost out to the United bid of Canada, Mexico, and the United States. It is now planning on bidding for the 2030 FIFA World Cup.

References

External links
Stadium information (yabiladi.com)
Stadium information (maroc-football.com)
Stadium information (economiste.com)

Football venues in Morocco
Proposed stadiums
Sports venues in Casablanca
Proposed buildings and structures in Morocco